Ramona Forchini (born 14 June 1994) is a Swiss racing cyclist. She rode in the women's road race event at the 2017 UCI Road World Championships. She was on the start list for the cross-country at the 2018 European Mountain Bike Championships, and finished in ninth place.

Major results
Source: 

2012
 4th Cross-country eliminator, UCI Mountain Bike & Trials World Championships
 5th Time trial, UCI Junior Road World Championships
2013
 3rd  Cross-country eliminator, European Mountain Bike Championships
2014
 3rd  Time trial, UEC European Road Championships
 UCI Mountain Bike & Trials World Championships
5th Cross-country eliminator
9th Under-23 cross-country
2015
 1st  Under-23 cross-country, UCI Mountain Bike & Trials World Championships
 2nd Time trial, National Road Championships
2016
 3rd  Cross-country eliminator, UCI Mountain Bike & Trials World Championships
 6th Overall Under-23 cross-country, UCI Mountain Bike World Cup
2018
 2nd Cross-country, National Mountain Bike Championships
2019
 1st  Team relay, European Mountain Bike Championships
 3rd Cross-country, National Mountain Bike Championships
2020
 1st  Women's race, UCI Mountain Bike Marathon World Championships
2021
 3rd  Cross-country marathon, UEC European Mountain Bike Championships
2022
 3rd  Cross-country, UCI Mountain Bike World Cup, Vallnord

References

External links

1994 births
Living people
Swiss female cyclists
Place of birth missing (living people)
21st-century Swiss women